Caning (Cantonese: 打籐 Jyutping: daa2 tang4) is a 1979 Hong Kong crime drama film directed by Bowie Wu and Wong Man, and starring Chong Lee-Lee and Wai Wang.

Plot

Cast 
 Chong Lee-Lee
 Wai Wang

External links 
 

Hong Kong drama films
1970s Hong Kong films